Robert Schilling may refer to:

Robert F. Schilling (1919–2014), American physician known for his research on vitamin B12
Robert T. “Bobby” Schilling (born 1964), Republican nominee in the 2010 general election for the 17th Illinois congressional district.
Robert Schilling (historian) (1913–2004), French historian and Latinist